Letters from Iceland is a travel book in prose and verse by W. H. Auden and Louis MacNeice, published in 1937.

The book is made up of a series of letters and travel notes by Auden and MacNeice written during their trip to Iceland in 1936 compiling light-hearted private jokes and irreverent comments about their surrounding world.

Auden's contributions include the poem "Journey to Iceland"; a prose section "For Tourists"; a five-part verse "Letter to Lord Byron"; a selection of writings on Iceland by other authors, "Sheaves from Sagaland"; a prose letter to "E. M. Auden" (E.M. was Erika Mann), which included his poems "Detective Story" and "O who can ever praise enough"; a prose letter to Kristian Andreirsson, Esq.; a free-verse letter to William Coldstream, and, in collaboration with MacNeice, "W. H. Auden and Louis MacNeice: Their Last Will and Testament" (in verse).

MacNeice's contributions include a verse letter to Graham and Anne Shepard; the satiric prose "Hetty to Nancy" (unsigned); a verse Epilogue; and MacNeice's contributions to "W. H. Auden and Louis MacNeice: Their Last Will and Testament".

Auden revised his sections of the book for a new edition published in 1966.

The book is mentioned multiple times throughout the 2007 Oscar-nominated film, Away from Her, in which several passages are read aloud during the film.

Letters from Iceland is categorised under the "Inter-war pastorals" style of writing, where poets are attached to an imaginary countryside from where they contemplate people, literature and politics.

The book is considered as a thirties classics.

Editions 
"20 editions published between 1937 and 2007 in 4 languages and held by 916 libraries worldwide"

 Date Published: 1937 Description: Hardback. 1st. Ed. 8.7" x 5.7". 268 pp. Publisher: Faber and Faber, London
 Date Published: 1969 Description: Hardback. "First Printing" 8.7" x 5.7". 253 pp.+ Publisher: Random House, New York
 "For this edition W. H. Auden has made several revisions of certain sections of the work and has written a new Foreword.
 "In April 1964, I revisited Iceland..." -W. H. Auden, 1965
 Date Published: 1973  
 Date Published: 1985  
 Date Published: 2002   Binding: Paperback Publisher: Faber and Faber

References

 W. H. Auden, Prose and Travel Books in Prose and Verse, 1927-1938, ed. Edward Mendelson (1997)
 John Fuller, W. H. Auden: A Commentary (1999).
 Edward Mendelson, Early Auden (1981).

In Film

Letters from Iceland is referenced in several scenes of the 2006 film Away from Her. The protagonist, whose wife is suffering from Alzheimer's disease, reads to her passages from the book, which - until she lost her memory - was dear to both of them.

External links

 The W. H. Auden Society

1937 books
Books by W. H. Auden
Collaborative books
Poetry by W. H. Auden
Faber and Faber books